Imphal district was a district in the state of Manipur in India. In 1997, it was split into Imphal East district with its seat in the city of Porompat, and Imphal West district, whose seat is Lamphelpat.

References

Districts of Manipur
Former districts of India